Dīs Pater (genitive Dītis Patris), otherwise known as Rex Infernus or Pluto, is a Roman god of the underworld. Dis was originally associated with fertile agricultural land and mineral wealth, and since those minerals came from underground, he was later equated with the chthonic deities Pluto (Hades) and Orcus.

Dīs Pater's name was commonly shortened to Dīs, and this name has since become an alternative name for the underworld or a part of the underworld, such as the City of Dis of Dante's The Divine Comedy, which comprises Lower Hell.

Etymology
The name Dīs is a contraction of the Latin adjective dīves ('wealthy, rich'), probably derived from dīvus, dīus ('godlike, divine') via the form *deiu-(o)t- or *deiu-(e)t- ('who is like the gods, protected by/from the gods'). The occurrence of the deity Dīs together with Pater ('father') may be due to association with Di(e)spiter (Jupiter).

Cicero gave a similar etymology in De Natura Deorum, suggesting the meaning 'father of riches', and comparing the deity to the Greek name Pluto (Plouton, Πλούτων), meaning "the rich one", a title bestowed upon the Greek god Hades.

Mythology

Dīs Pater eventually became associated with death and the underworld because mineral wealth such as gems and precious metals came from underground, wherein lies the realm of the dead, i.e. Hades' (Pluto's) domain.

In being conflated with Pluto, Dīs Pater took on some of the latter's mythological attributes, being one of the three sons of Saturn (Greek Cronus) and Ops (Greek Rhea), along with Jupiter (Greek Zeus) and Neptune (Greek Poseidon). He ruled the underworld and the dead beside his wife, Proserpina (Greek Persephone). In literature, Dīs Pater's name was commonly used as a symbolic and poetic way of referring to death itself.

Dīs Pater was sometimes identified with the Sabine god Soranus. Julius Caesar, in his Commentaries on the Gallic Wars (VI:18), states that the Gauls all claimed descent from Dīs Pater. This is an example of interpretatio romana: what Caesar meant was that the Gauls all claimed descent from a Gaulish god that he equated with the Roman Dīs Pater.

A scholium on the Pharsalia equates Dis Pater with Taranis, the Gaulish god of thunder. In southern Germany and the Balkans, Aericura was considered a consort of Dīs Pater.

Worship
In 249 BC and 207 BC, the Roman Senate under senator Lucius Catellius ordained special festivals to appease Dīs Pater and Proserpina. Every hundred years, a festival was celebrated in his name. According to legend, a round marble altar, Altar of Dīs Pater and Proserpina, was miraculously discovered by the servants of a Sabine called Valesius, the ancestor of the first consul. The servants were digging in the Tarentum on the edge of the Campus Martius to lay foundations following instructions given to Valesius's children in dreams, when they found the altar  underground. Valesius reburied the altar after three days of games. Sacrifices were offered to this altar during the Ludi Saeculares or Ludi Tarentini. It may have been uncovered for each occasion of the games, to be reburied afterwards, a clearly chthonic tradition of worship. It was rediscovered in 1886–1887 beneath the Corso Vittorio Emanuele in Rome.

See also
 Crom (fictional deity)
 Demeter
 Dievas
 Dyaus Pita
 God the Father
 Hades
 Tiwaz
 Zeus

References

Bibliography

External links

Roman gods
Death gods
Underworld gods
Celtic gods
Roman underworld
Metamorphoses characters
Legendary progenitors
Agricultural gods
Fertility gods
Earth gods
Abundance gods
Fortune gods
Hades